KJHS may refer to:

Kehillah Jewish High School
Kennedy Junior High School
Kermit Junior High School
Killicomaine Junior High School
Kaunas Jesuit High School( Kaunas Jesuit Gymnasium )
KJHS-LP, a low-power radio station (107.9 FM) licensed to serve Wenatchee, Washington, United States